The 1973 British League season was the 39th season of the top tier of speedway in the United Kingdom and the ninth season of the British League.

Summary
Glasgow Tigers relocated to become Coatbridge Tigers.

The Reading Racers won their first title, ending the dominance of Belle Vue Aces who could only finish in sixth place. Swede Anders Michanek was in imperious form, going undefeated at Reading Stadium (which was in its final year as a venue). He finished with an 11.36 average ahead of the four time world champion Ivan Mauger on 11.29. In addition to Michanek the Reading team was boosted by high scoring from Norwegian Dag Lövaas and Australian Geoff Curtis. In a sensational finish to the 1973 Knockout Cup final Reading were beaten by Belle Vue in a run-off for the Cup after an aggregate draw over two legs.

Reading's success had a sour note after the season had finished when Geoff Curtis returned to Australia for the Australian season and was killed in a race at the Sydney Showground in December.

Final table
M = Matches; W = Wins; D = Draws; L = Losses; Pts = Total Points

British League Knockout Cup
The 1973 Speedway Star British League Knockout Cup was the 35th edition of the Knockout Cup for tier one teams. Belle Vue were the winners after Peter Collins of Belle Vue defeated Anders Michanek of Reading in a race-off because the tie had finished 78-78 on aggregate.

First round

Second round

Quarter-finals

Semi-finals

Final

First leg

Second leg

Match finished 78-78 on aggregate. Belle Vue won race-off.

Leading final averages
Both Anders Michanek and Ivan Mauger recorded perfect 12 point average scores at home for the season, meaning they were unbeaten by any opposing rider on their own track in League competition.

Riders & final averages
Belle Vue

 10.55
 9.08
 8.73
 7.00
 6.94
 6.21
 5.67
 5.16
 3.52
 3.05

Coatbridge

 9.01
 8.00 
 6.38 
 5.03
 4.82
 4.55
 4.13 
 1.79

Coventry

 8.59 
 8.33 
 8.32 
 6.31
 5.55
 4.83
 4.65
 3.44
 3.26
 3.20
 2.53

Cradley Heath

 9.38
 (Kid Brodie) 9.12
  6.62
 5.77
 4.85
 4.49
 4.46
 4.40
 3.44
 2.50

Exeter

 11.29
 7.57 
 6.38 
 6.00
 5.80 
 5.34
 4.74
 4.48

Hackney

 8.86
 7.83 
 6.41
 5.55
 5.44
 5.40
 5.29
 4.31

Halifax

 10.32
 6.92
 6.31
 6.25
 5.63
 5.14
 4.19
 3.28
 2.33
 1.22

Ipswich

 10.06
 7.46
 7.43
 6.09
 5.87
 5.68
 3.20

King's Lynn

 10.26 
 9.95
 6.28 
 6.07
 5.44
 5.35
 4.82
 4.71
 4.22

Leicester

 10.24 
 9.44
 9.24 
 5.80
 4.67 
 4.37
 4.21
 3.09

Newport

 9.77 
 7.39
 7.37
 7.28
 6.01
 4.79
 3.93
 3.62

Oxford

 7.77
 7.32
 6.42
 6.19
 6.09
 5.81
 5.72
 5.38 
 4.80
 3.24

Poole

 9.58
 8.30
 7.18
 6.49 
 5.93
 5.36
 4.34
 3.70
 2.40
 2.10

Reading

 11.36
 10.06 
 8.23 
 6.05
 5.83
 5.28
 4.46
 3.20

Sheffield

 9.30 
 7.78 
 7.72
 7.36
 7.06
 6.92
 6.85

Swindon

 10.18 
 7.34
 6.81
 6.67
 4.90
 4.25
 4.18
 3.58
 2.48
 0.94
 0.50

Wimbledon

 9.19
 7.74
 6.95
 6.75
 5.09
 5.09
 4.72
 3.06
 2.09

Wolverhampton

 10.82
 7.93
 6.73
 5.99
 5.47
 4.67
 4.63
 4.55
 4.33
 3.82
 2.95

See also
List of United Kingdom Speedway League Champions
Knockout Cup (speedway)

References

British League
1973 in British motorsport
1973 in speedway